Drissa Kone (born 1960) is a djembe master drummer from Mali.

Early life 

At an early age, and against the will of his parents, he began drumming in his home village. When he was 13 years old he moved to the capital city Bamako, to study under  Yamadu Bani Dunbia.

Career
In the 1980s Drissa toured throughout Mali as a popular festival drummer and soloist for numerous ballets.

In 1989 he met the artists Ulli Sanou and Gerhard Kero in Mali, who after intensive instruction became well-liked members of his festival music ensemble. In 1991 he went to Europe for the first time to join their music group SANZA, performing at many concerts with them in the following seven years. The recordings SANZA live and SANZA in search of the one were made during this time. Later engagements took Drissa to France, Spain, Norway, Germany and Switzerland.

In the summer of 2006, he headed a two-week special seminar for professionals at the Codarts University for the Arts  in Rotterdam. In 2009 he became an instructor at the Dj.e.m.be- Djembe education moduls beatfactory. In 2011 he was teaching at the international festival Impulstanz in Vienna.

He is regarded as a master drummer.

Discography 
 1992 - SANZA live EX 141-2
 1994 - SANZA in search of the 1 EX220-2
 2007 - Kurubamako EX697-2 beatfactory production
 2007 - appearing also on - Argile - Filefola: The Flute Album (bibiafrica records)
 2008 - The Art of Jenbe Drumming - The Mali Tradition Vol. 2 (bibiafrica records)

References

African drummers
Master drummers
Living people
20th-century drummers
20th-century male musicians
21st-century drummers
21st-century male musicians
1960 births